Alexandr Vasyukhno (born 1 June 1997) is a Russian professional racing cyclist. He rode in the men's 1 km time trial event at the 2017 UCI Track Cycling World Championships.

References

External links
 

1997 births
Living people
Russian male cyclists
Place of birth missing (living people)